Princess Charlotte Wilhelmine of Saxe-Coburg-Saalfeld (14 June 1685 in Coburg - 5 April 1767 in Hanau) was a German princess by birth and Countess of Hanau-Münzenberg by marriage.

Life 
She was the daughter of the John Ernest IV, Duke of Saxe-Coburg-Saalfeld, and his wife, the Duchess Sophie Hedwig of Saxe-Merseburg (1666-1686).

She married Philip Reinhard, Count of Hanau-Münzenberg (1664-1712). She was his second wife and survived him by more than half a century. This marriage, however, remained childless.

Widowhood 
After her husband's death, she received Babenhausen Castle as her widow seat.  With the death of Johann Reinhard III, Count of Hanau-Lichtenberg, the House of Hanau died out in the male line. The County fell to Hesse and was divided between Hesse-Kassel and Hesse-Darmstadt.  She received the stately home Salzhaus in the old city of Hanau, where she lived the rest of her life.

Death 
She died on 5 April 1767 at the Salzhaus.  She was the last surviving member of the House of Hanau.  She was buried on 11 April 1767 in the family crypt in the Lutheran Church (now called the Old St. John's Church) in Hanau. her tomb was largely destroyed when the town was bombed during World War II.

References 

 Reinhard Dietrich: Die Landesverfassung in dem Hanauischen, in the series Hanauer Geschichtsblätter, vol. 34, Hanau, 1996, 
 Uta Löwenstein: “Daß sie sich uf ihren Withumbsitz begeben und sich sonsten anderer Herrschaften Sachen und Handlungen nicht unternehmen ...“. Hofhaltungen fürstlicher Frauen und Witwen in der frühen Neuzeit, in: Frühneuzeitliche Hofkultur in Hessen und Thüringen, in the series Jenaer Studien, vol. 1, ed. by Jörg Jochen Berns and Detlev Ignasiak, Palm & Enke, Erlangen, 1993, p. 115 – 141
 Pauline Ruppel: Die Problematik der Ausübung von Vormundschaften in Herrscherhäusern durch die Mütter, erörtert und analysiert am Beispiel der Gräfin Catarina Belgia von Hanau-Münzenberg, unpublished thesis, Marburg, 1997, p. 39.
 Reinhard Suchier: Genealogie des Hanauer Grafenhauses, in: Festschrift des Hanauer Geschichtsvereins zu seiner fünfzigjährigen Jubelfeier am 27. August 1894, Hanau, 1894
 Reinhard Suchier: Die Grabmonumente und Särge der in Hanau bestatteten Personen aus den Häusern Hanau und Hessen, in: Programm des Königlichen Gymnasiums zu Hanau, Hanau, 1879, p. 1-56
Richard Wille: Die letzten Grafen von Hanau-Lichtenberg, in the series Mitteilungen des Hanauer Bezirksvereins für hessische Geschichte und Landeskunde, vol. 12, Hanau, 1886, p. 56-68
 Ernst J. Zimmermann: Hanau Stadt und Land, 3rded., Hanau, 1919, reprinted 1978

People from Coburg
House of Wettin
Princesses of Saxe-Coburg-Saalfeld
1685 births
1767 deaths
18th-century German people
German countesses
House of Hanau
Daughters of monarchs